Alvin Chau Cheok-wa, nicknamed Sai Mai-wa (洗米華), is a Macanese-born businessman and founder of Suncity Group. A former member of the Chinese People's Political Consultative Conference's Guangdong Provincial Committee, he was convicted in January 2023 of leading a criminal syndicate, and running illegal gambling and fraud operations, and sentenced to 18 years in prison.

References 

People from Zhaoqing
Macau people
1974 births
Macau businesspeople
21st-century Macau people
Chinese prisoners and detainees
Members of the Chinese People's Political Consultative Conference
Living people